INKAS Group of Companies is a group of privately held Canadian corporations that specialize largely in the security, manufacturing, and financial industries. Many of the company’s divisions and brands operate under the registered trademark of INKAS, and include armored vehicle and safe manufacturing, metal fabrication, aerospace and defense, financial services, and environmental protection services. The company was established over 25 years ago in Toronto, Canada, where it remains headquartered today.

INKAS has worked with federal and provincial governments, and numerous authorities worldwide. Some of their clients include the United Nations, NATO, the Government of Canada, the Government of the United States, as well as embassies. INKAS also provides a number of products and services to financial institutions, corporations and individuals around the world.

INKAS Group of Companies 
INKAS was founded in August 1995 in Toronto, Canada, by David Khazanski and Margarita Simkin as a single-truck armored courier service specializing in the secure transportation of cash and valuables. INKAS has established and grown various divisions and brands over the years, some of which have gone on be acquired by major players in their industries. The company’s divisions include armored vehicle manufacturing, safes manufacturing, security solutions and services, aerospace and defense, financial solutions, and environmental protection services. 

INKAS prioritizes quality assurance and maintaining high standards, and the company is ISO 9001 (Quality) certified, ISO 14001 (Environmental) certified, and ISO 45001 (Safety) certified. The company’s manufacturing facilities are National Safety Mark (NSM) certified, and it maintains a valid Controlled Goods Certificate with the Government of Canada for its armored vehicles, as well as its security and defense solutions.

In April 2014, INKAS acquired its new headquarters and manufacturing facility, and in March 2020, the company opened a second manufacturing facility in Toronto. The company also has offices, production facilities, and service centers internationally, including in Lagos, Nigeria.

The Khazanski Foundation 
The Khazanski Foundation is a private foundation that was established in August 2019 by David Khazanski to actively support philanthropically focused initiatives that are beneficial to society as a whole. It is a registered charity in Canada with a mission to promote and support the well-being of individuals in Canada and around the world through raising awareness of critical issues, investing in innovation, and providing financial support.

Criticism 
In July and August 2017, CBC News reported that INCAS signed a deal with Azerbaijan’s interior ministry under which the company had delivered several Canadian-made armoured personnel carriers (APCs) to Azerbaijan. This provoked strong condemnation from the Armenian-Canadian population who were concerned that they would be used in the Nagorno-Karabakh conflict or the Armenia-Azerbaijan border crisis, leading to the Canadian government promising to meet with the representatives of the Armenian community. Ramil Huseynli — Azerbaijan's Chargé d’Affaires in Ottawa — responded by saying "...the acquisition of armoured personnel carriers from a Canadian company does not pose such a threat [to regional peace and stability], as these vehicles are intended only for law enforcement and civilian transport. In this light, the hysteria of the Armenian community, who should put Canadian interests above the rest, is unintelligible.” According to the 2016 Report on Exports of Military Goods from Canada, Azerbaijan bought $378,705 worth of fire arms and ground vehicles in Canada.

References

External links

Companies based in Toronto